Carnot's theorem (named after Lazare Carnot) describes a relation between conic sections and triangles.

.

References 
Huub P.M. van Kempen: On Some Theorems of Poncelet and Carnot. Forum Geometricorum, Volume 6 (2006), pp. 229–234.
Lorenz Halbeisen, Norbert Hungerbühler, Juan Läuchli: Mit harmonischen Verhältnissen zu Kegelschnitten: Perlen der klassischen Geometrie. Springer 2016, pp. 40, 168–173 (German)

External links 
 Carnot's theorem
Carnot's Theorem for Conics at cut-the-knot.org

Theorems about triangles